Bint el-Basha el-Mudir (lit. “Daughter of the Pasha in Charge”) is an Egyptian film released in 1938.

Synopsis
The story is a tragic tale of a woman named who disguises herself as a man to support her family after her brother dies in an accident en route to work. The children of a Pasha, named Badriya and Tewfik, who she has been teaching under her real name of Hikmat Effendi (her tutor brother), grow to love her as part of the family and complications ensue.

Cast
 Assia Dagher (Hikmat)
 Mary Queeny (Badria)
 Ahmad Galal (Tawfik)
 Mohsen Sarhan
 Zeinab Nusrat (Pasha’s wife)
 Ahmed Darwish (Jaafar Pasha)
 Wajih Al-Arabi (Pasha’s son)
 Abdel Mona'em Saoudi
 Fouad Al-Masry
 Ali Ghalib (Bayoumi Effendi)

References

1938 films
Egyptian black-and-white films